The men's 50 metre freestyle event at the 2016 Summer Olympics took place between 11–12 August at the Olympic Aquatics Stadium.

Summary
Sixteen years after he tied for the gold with Gary Hall, Jr., U.S. swimmer Anthony Ervin, aged 35, reclaimed his title in the program's shortest race to become the oldest male champion in Olympic swimming history. He threw down a gold-medal time of 21.40 to touch out the defending titleholder Florent Manaudou of France by a hundredth of a second. Manaudou was quick off the blocks, but could not catch Ervin near the wall to finish with a silver in 21.41. Meanwhile, Ervin's teammate Nathan Adrian swam to another bronze-medal feat at the Games with a 21.49.

Separated the top three by almost two tenths of a second, Great Britain's Benjamin Proud finished off the podium with a fourth-place time in 21.68, while Ukraine's Andriy Govorov, who led a vast field of swimmers earlier in the heats, slipped shortly to fifth in 21.74. Brazil's hometown favorite Bruno Fratus, fourth-place finalist from London 2012, and South Africa's Brad Tandy shared the sixth spot in a matching 21.79, with Lithuanian swimmer Simonas Bilis (22.08) closing out the field.

Other notable swimmers featured Australia's Cameron McEvoy, Russia's Vladimir Morozov, Manaudou's brother-in-law and countryman Frédérick Bousquet, and Trinidad and Tobago's George Bovell, who scored a twenty-seventh place finish in his fifth Olympic appearance.

Records
Prior to this competition, the existing world and Olympic records were as follows.

Qualification

The Olympic Qualifying Time for the event was 22.27 seconds. Up to two swimmers per National Olympic Committee (NOC) could automatically qualify by swimming that time at an approved qualification event. The Olympic Selection Time was 23.05 seconds. Up to one swimmer per NOC meeting that time was eligible for selection, allocated by world ranking until the maximum quota for all swimming events was reached. NOCs without a male swimmer qualified in any event could also use their universality place.

Competition format

The competition consisted of three rounds: heats, semifinals, and a final. The swimmers with the best 16 times in the heats advanced to the semifinals. The swimmers with the best 8 times in the semifinals advanced to the final. Swim-offs were used as necessary to break ties for advancement to the next round.

Results

Heats

The swimmers with the top 16 times, regardless of heat, advanced to the semifinals.

Semifinals

The swimmers with the best 8 times, regardless of heat, advanced to the final.

Final

References

Men's 00050 metre freestyle
Olympics
Men's events at the 2016 Summer Olympics